The Kulturpalast Dresden is a modernist building built by Wolfgang Hänsch during the era of the German Democratic Republic. It was the largest multi-purpose hall in Dresden when it opened in 1969, and was used for concerts, dances, conferences and other events. The building underwent several years of reconstruction beginning in 2012 and opened with a new concert hall in April 2017.

Unlike the other buildings in the Altmarkt square, the Kulturpalast is designed in the unadorned International Style. It faces Wilsdruffer Straße and forms the second part of the Altmarkt square. Located east of Schloßstraße and southwest of nearby Neumarkt, which has been undergoing a reconstruction project since 2005, it lies in the center of the historic old town, which was largely destroyed during the firebombing of Dresden on 13 February 1945.

History

Planning and construction 

The Kulturpalast was planned as a Socialist Classicist ensemble building. The intention was to erect a high-rise building in the style of the Seven Sisters in Moscow. In 1950, the GDR published The Sixteen Principles of Urban Design, whose important principles included a central square, cityscape-forming high-rise buildings, and wide main roads; the Kulturpalast was intended to fulfill the "dominant high ground" function. This version of the project was never built.

The Kulturpalast was re-designed in the 1960s as the cultural center of the city and district of Dresden. The new design was a two-story cubic building based on plans by Leopold Wiel.

Refurbishment and renovation 
Due to improper reconstruction work in the 1990s, it became necessary to renovate the Kulturpalast's fire protection equipment, leading to a five-month closure in the summer of 2007. In the weeks before the renovation fire engines were stationed next to the building during events.

The building closed for extensive renovations in July 2012. Exterior construction work began in October 2013. The new concert hall, designed by Gerkan, Marg and Partners, reopened in April 2017.

Building 

Due to a special "tilting parquet", the Kulturpalast's original multi-functional ballroom could be used as either a 2435-seat auditorium with rising rows of seats or as a level banquet area. The building also contained a 192-seat studio theatre, classrooms, rehearsal and performance rooms, offices, and a restaurant.

The new concert hall, installed in the 2012–2017 reconstruction, has fewer seats but is designed to better suit its main tenant, the Dresden Philharmonic.

Artwork 

The mural, titled Der Weg der roten Fahne (The Way of the Red Flag), is made of concrete slabs electrostatically coated with colored glass. On the first floor is a  frieze by Heinz Drache and Walter Rehn titled Unser sozialistisches Leben (Our Socialist Life).

The five main entrance doors were designed by Gerd Jaeger in 1969 and represent Dresden's development from a fishing village to a large city. The doors were cast in bronze by Pirner & Franz in Dresden.

When the building first opened it had three water features on the Wilsdruffer Straße side, consisting of terrazzo pools with large fountains in each basin and smaller fountains around the edges. The fountains were removed in the course of construction work for an underground car park at Altmarkt.

Organ 
The inclusion of an organ in state concert hall was not a certainty in the 1960s, as organ music was associated with churches. However, one was installed in 1970 shortly after the building opened. The original organ, built by Jehmlich Orgelbau Dresden, was based on a mobile frame so it could be moved on and off the stage. This mobility limited its size; the organ measured  and had 24 stops over two manuals and pedals. When the Kulturpalast was renovated in 2012, the organ was dismantled and re-installed in St. Mary, Queen of Peace, Church in Cottbus.

A new organ was installed in September 2017.

Gallery

References

Literature 
 Birk Engmann: Bauen für die Ewigkeit: Monumentalarchitektur des zwanzigsten Jahrhunderts und Städtebau in Leipzig in den fünfziger Jahren. Sax-Verlag, Beucha, Germany, 2006, German
 Wolfgang Hänsch: Haus der sozialistischen Kultur. In: Deutsche Architektur. Issue 4, 1968, P. 212–671, German
 Meinhard von Gerkan, Stephan Schütz (Ed.): Kulturpalast Dresden. Publisher Jovis Verlag, Berlin 2017, German

External links 

 Website Kulturpalast Dresden, German
 Kulturpalast – Geistig- kulturelles Zentrum der Stadt und des Bezirkes Dresden. Palace of Culture - spiritual and cultural centre of the city and district of Dresden., German
 Historical facts about the Dresden Palace of Culture at the website of the Society Historischer Neumarkt Dresden, German
 Initiative to preserve the Dresden Palace of Culture (As of 2006), German
 Chronology of the reconstruction at the website of the city of Dresden, German
 Historical pictures from the construction period, German
 Sächsische Bibliographie, German

1969 establishments in East Germany
Concert halls in Germany
East German architecture
Dresden
1960s architecture
Organs (music)
Individual pipe organs
Public venues with a theatre organ
Culture of Saxony
Entertainment venues in Germany